The Ampol Tournament was the richest golf event of its time in Australia. From 1952 the sponsor, Ampol, offered great prize money to attract the leading American and European players to compete.

Total prize money was initially A£1,000, rising to A£1,300 in 1951. In 1952 and 1954, two tournaments were arranged a few weeks apart. Prize money was A£3,500 for each of the 1952 events while each of the 1954 events had prize money of A£1,500. The A£10,000 in 1956 was the biggest purse outside the United States. Prize money was A£2,500 in 1953 and 1955 and A£3,000 in 1957 and 1959. Prize money often exceeded the advertised figures since part of the proceeds from gate receipts was sometimes added.

The 1959 tournament was played the week before the 1959 Canada Cup.

Winners

In October 1952 Von Nida beat Oliver 72 to 77 in the 18-hole playoff. In November 1954 the first round was played at Huntingdale Golf Club. The 1959 event was over 54 holes. Ampol sponsored a 36-hole tournament in 1958 with total prize money of A£500. This event was won by an amateur, Bob Stevens.

References

Golf tournaments in Australia
Recurring sporting events established in 1947
Recurring sporting events disestablished in 1959
1947 establishments in Australia
1959 disestablishments in Australia